The 1953 U.S. National Championships (now known as the US Open) was a tennis tournament that took place on the outdoor grass courts at the West Side Tennis Club, Forest Hills in New York City, United States. The tournament ran from 29 August until 7 September. It was the 73rd staging of the U.S. National Championships, and the fourth Grand Slam tennis event of the year.

Finals

Men's singles

 Tony Trabert defeated  Vic Seixas  6–3, 6–2, 6–3

Women's singles

 Maureen Connolly defeated  Doris Hart  6–2, 6–4

Men's doubles
 Rex Hartwig /  Mervyn Rose defeated  Gardnar Mulloy /  Bill Talbert 6–4, 4–6, 6–2, 6–4

Women's doubles
 Shirley Fry /  Doris Hart defeated  Louise Brough /  Margaret Osborne duPont 6–2, 7–9, 9–7

Mixed doubles
 Doris Hart /   Vic Seixas defeated  Julia Sampson /  Rex Hartwig 6–2, 4–6, 6–4

References

External links
Official US Open website

 
U.S. National Championships
U.S. National Championships (tennis) by year
U.S. National Championships
U.S. National Championships
U.S. National Championships
U.S. National Championships